Ifan may refer to:

People 
Ifan (given name), list of people with this name
 Ifan Evans (born 1983), Welsh rugby union player
 Wil Ifan
 The nickname of Riefian Fajarsyah of a former Seventeen member, disbanded by 2018 Sunda Strait tsunami.

Places 
Betws Ifan, a small village located in Ceredigion, Wales
Ifan, Nigeria, a city in southern Nigeria
Pentre Ifan, an ancient manor in Nevern, North Pembrokeshire, West Wales
Ysbyty Ifan, a small but historic village in Conwy, north Wales

Other 
IFAN Museum of African Arts in Dakar, Senegal is one of the oldest art museums in West Africa
 The Institut Fondamental d'Afrique Noire, academic centers in Francophone West Africa
 Independent Food Aid Network, UK network of independent food aid providers